Manfred Schubert (27 April 1937 – 10 June 2011) was a German composer, conductor and music critic.

Life 
Schubert was born the son of a lawyer in Berlin-Charlottenburg. In his youth, he received violin and piano lessons; he passed his Abitur in Berlin-Köpenick. From 1955 to 1960, he studied music education with Fritz Reuter, Georg Knepler and Siegfried Bimberg and Slavic studies at the Humboldt-Universität zu Berlin. Von 1960 bis 1963 war er  for musical composition with Rudolf Wagner-Régeny at the Academy of Arts, Berlin. From 1962 to 1990, he worked regularly as a music critic for the Berliner Zeitung, after that only sporadically. In 1978, he conducted the Staatskapelle Berlin at a guest concert in Lyon. From 1984 to 1985, he worked as a lecturer in composition and instrumentation at the Hochschule für Musik "Hanns Eisler". Since 1963, he lived in Berlin as a freelance composer.

Schubert died in Berlin at the age of 74. His estate is owned by the Berlin State Library.

Work

Compositions 
Source:

Orchestral works 
 1965: Tanzstudien, for small orchestra (15')
 1966: Orchestermusik 66 (Paean) (7')
 1966: Suite für Orchester (22')
 1970: Divertimento für Orchester (14')
 1971: Konzert für Klarinette und Orchester (22')
 1972: Hommage à Rudolf Wagner-Régeny, Concertante meditations for harp solo, 13 string instruments, percussion and celesta (20')
 1974: Cantilena e Capriccio, per violino ed orchestra (16')
 1979–82: I. Sinfonie, for large orchestra (32')
 1988: Konzert für zwei Violinen und Orchester (25')
 1990: Vogelreden III, Capriccio für 6 Flöten (1 Spieler) und Streichorchester (22')
 1998–05: Ein ökumenisches Te Deum, for four solo voices, speaker, eight-part mixed choir, organ and large orchestra (75')

Chamber music 
 1961: Musik für sieben Instrumente (12')
 1963: I. Streichquartett (16')
 1966: Sonata per flauto solo (15')
 1967: Moments musicaux, for wind quintet (12')
 1967: Septett (11')
 1967/68: Nachtstück und Passacaglia, for octet (17')
 1970: II. Streichquartett (14')
 1975: Evocazione, per undici esecutori (10')
 1984/85: Vogelreden II, Concertante Duo for Flute and Harp (12')
 1987: Elegia con elgeganza, Canto aleatorio V per contrabbasso solo (9')
 1987: Ramificazioni, Canto aleatorio VI per arpa sola (9')
 2002: Trazóm Suédama, Trio for oboe, violin and violoncello (18')

Piano pieces 
 1960: Variazioni per pianoforte (11')
 1961: I. Klaviersonate (10')
 1963: II. Klaviersonate (11')
 1967: Serenata semplice (3')
 1969: Vier Cembalostücke (7')
 1976: Esde Hafis, Canto aleatorio II per pianoforte solo (7')

Vocal music 
 1964: Acht Lieder, on poems by Bertolt Brecht (9')
 1964: Traumwald, Four Lieder on poems by Christian Morgenstern for baritone and String Orchestra (6')
 1973: Canzone amorose, Concerto for baritone and large orchestra on poems by Johannes Bobrowski (22')
 1986: Nachtgesänge, after Carl Friedrich Zelter together with two intermezzi for medium voice and small orchestra (Goethe) (20')
 1992: Miserere, for eight–part mixed choir and organ (8')
 1996: Misericordia ejus, antiphon for 2 mixed choirs a cappella (12')
 1995–97: Missa viadrina, for eight–part mixed choir a cappella (50')
 2006: Zweite Romantik, seven sonnets for medium voice and piano (32')

Poetry collections 
 1997–2009: Blaues Haus auf rotem Grund; Reisegedichte
 1998–2006: Muse und Metier; Künstlerprobleme
 1993–2009: Wetterleuchten; Gedichte zwischen Hoffnung und Zweifel

Prizes 
 Composition Prize at the Prague Spring International Music Festival (1966)
  (1966)
 Hanns Eisler Prize of the Rundfunk der DDR (1977)
 Recognition by the International Rostrum of Composers of the UNESCO in Paris (1984)

Further reading 
 Schubert, Manfred. In: Wilfried W. Bruchhäuser: Komponisten der Gegenwart im Deutschen Komponisten-Interessenverband. Ein Handbuch. 4th edition. Deutscher Komponisten-Interessenverband, Berlin 1995, .
 Vera Grützner: Manfred Schubert. In Komponisten der Gegenwart (KDG). Edition Text & Kritik, Munich 1996, .
 Manfred Schubert. In Peter Hollfelder: Geschichte der Klaviermusik. Volume 1. Noetzel, Wilhelmshaven 1989, .

References

External links 
 
 

German music critics
German conductors (music)
20th-century German composers
20th-century classical composers
Academic staff of the Hochschule für Musik Hanns Eisler Berlin
1937 births
2011 deaths
Musicians from Berlin